Medical Examination of Young Persons (Sea) Convention, 1921 is  an International Labour Organization Convention.

It was established in 1921:
Having decided upon the adoption of certain proposals with regard to the compulsory medical examination of children and young persons employed at sea,...

Ratifications
As of 2023, the convention has been ratified by 82 states. Of these, 56 states have subsequently denounced the treaty.

External links 
Text.
Ratifications.

Youth rights
International Labour Organization conventions
Treaties concluded in 1921
Treaties entered into force in 1922
Treaties of the People's Socialist Republic of Albania
Treaties of Argentina
Treaties of Azerbaijan
Treaties of Bangladesh
Treaties of the Byelorussian Soviet Socialist Republic
Treaties of Belgium
Treaties of Belize
Treaties of Bosnia and Herzegovina
Treaties of Vargas-era Brazil
Treaties of Cameroon
Treaties of Chile
Treaties of the Republic of China (1912–1949)
Treaties of Colombia
Treaties of Costa Rica
Treaties of Cuba
Treaties of Djibouti
Treaties of Dominica
Treaties of Estonia
Treaties of the French Third Republic
Treaties of the Weimar Republic
Treaties of Ghana
Treaties of the Second Hellenic Republic
Politics of Grenada
Treaties of Guatemala
Treaties of Guinea
Treaties of the Kingdom of Hungary (1920–1946)
Treaties of British India
Treaties of the Iraqi Republic (1958–1968)
Treaties of the Irish Free State
Treaties of the Kingdom of Italy (1861–1946)
Treaties of Jamaica
Treaties of the Empire of Japan
Treaties of Kyrgyzstan
Treaties of Kenya
Treaties of Malaysia
Treaties of Mauritius
Treaties of Montenegro
Treaties of Mexico
Treaties of Myanmar
Treaties of New Zealand
Treaties of Nicaragua
Treaties of Nigeria
Treaties of the Dominion of Pakistan
Treaties of Panama
Treaties of the Kingdom of Romania
Treaties of Saint Lucia
Treaties of Serbia and Montenegro
Treaties of Yugoslavia
Treaties of Seychelles
Treaties of Sierra Leone
Treaties of Slovenia
Treaties of the Solomon Islands
Treaties of the Somali Republic
Treaties of the Dominion of Ceylon
Treaties of Tajikistan
Treaties of Tanganyika
Treaties of North Macedonia
Treaties of Trinidad and Tobago
Treaties of Tunisia
Treaties of the Ukrainian Soviet Socialist Republic
Treaties of the United Kingdom
Treaties of Uruguay
Treaties of the Yemen Arab Republic
Admiralty law treaties
Treaties extended to Greenland
Treaties extended to the French Southern and Antarctic Lands
Occupational safety and health treaties
1921 in labor relations